Pygora may refer to:
Pygora goat or its fleece
Pygora beetle